Körmenlik is a village in Çamlıyayla district of Mersin Province, Turkey. It a situated in the Taurus Mountains. The population of Körmenliks 312 as of 2012.

References

External links
For images

Villages in Çamlıyayla District